Bayani Casimiro Sr. (July 16, 1918 – February 27, 1989) was a Filipino dancer who was among the leading stars of bodabil (vaudeville) in the 1930s and 1940s. He also appeared in musical films and later in life, in comedic roles. A tap dancer, he was frequently dubbed as the "Fred Astaire of the Philippines".

Early years
Casimiro was born in Laguna. His parents were stage comedians, and at the age of 7, he would appear on stage, often dressed as a clown. By 1936, he would join a performing troupe in Hawaii headlined by Atang de la Rama.

Bodabil star
By the late 1930s, Casimiro began headlining major bodabil productions in Manila. He made a name for himself as a tap dancer, often in top hat and tails, and was soon nicknamed as "The Fred Astaire of the Philippines". Casimiro also first appeared in film in 1938,  when he was cast in Bayan at Pag-ibig, a production of Excelsior Pictures.

Upon the Japanese invasion of the Philippines in 1941, local film production was halted, allowing bodabil to thrive as the main source of public entertainment. Along with such actors as Rogelio de la Rosa, Norma Blancaflor and the comic team of Tugo and Pugo, Casimiro would perform at the Life Theater in Manila for the duration of the war. He would form his own comic tandem with Jose Cris Soto, and the pair would be promoted as the "Laurel and Hardy of the Philippines". Casimiro would also be paired with Dolphy, then appearing under the stage name "Golay", to form a comic dance team.

Film and television career
After the war, Casimiro restarted his film career, appearing in several popular musicals for the next two decades. His frequent onscreen dancing partner was the choreographer Nieves Manuel, whom he would marry. As in his stage performances, he would often appear in films in top hat and tails. Among his more notable musical roles were in Isang Sulyap mo Tita (1953), Tres Muskiteras (1954), and Botika sa Baryo (1960).

Later career
As he aged, Casimiro became known to a younger generation primarily as a character actor in film comedies. Often cast as a grandfather, a town sage, or even as a corpse in the Chiquito vehicle Estong Tutong (1983), his thin frame and befuddled look lent to easy ridicule. A notable exception to this trend was his role in Celso Ad. Castillo's Burlesk Queen (1977), where he again donned top hat and tails as he performed onstage with Vilma Santos.

Death
Bayani Casimiro Sr. died on February 27, 1989 in Manila, Philippines and he has a final resting place at the Loyola Memorial Park in Sucat, Paranaque City.

Tribute & Legacy
His most prominent role in later years was as the father of Enteng Kabisote (Vic Sotto) in the popular sitcom Okey Ka Fairy Ko!. Casimiro died less than two years into the run of Okey Ka Fairy Ko. His son, Bayani Casimiro, Jr., soon joined the cast as Prinsipe ng Kahilingan. In obvious tribute to his father, Casimiro Jr.'s character would perform a brief tap dance upon his every entrance and exit.

Personal life
Casimiro's widow, Nieves Manuel, would later marry Chiquito Pangan's brother, Rene Pangan. She died in 2006.

Filmography
1938 - Bayan at Pag-ibig (Excelsior)
1940 - Rosa Birhen (Del Monte)
1940 - Santa (Majestic)
1941 - Manilena (X'Otic)
1941 - Halimaw (X'Otic)
1941 - Kung Kita'y Kapiling (Acuna-Zaldariaga)
1942 - Caballero (RDR)
1946 - So Long America (Sampaguita Pictures)
1947 - Maling Akala (Lvn)
1947 - Ikaw Ay Akin (Lvn)
1947 - Oh, Salapi! (Lvn)
1948 - Malaya (Mutya sa Gubat) (Lvn)
1949 - Milyonarya (Lvn)
1949 - Maria Beles (Lvn)
1949 - Makabagong Pilipina (Lvn)
1949 - Hiyas ng Pamilihan (Lvn)
1949 - Kuba sa Quiapo (Lvn)
1949 - Lupang Pangako (Lvn)
1949 - Hen. Gregorio del Pilar (Lvn)
1950 - Sohrab at Rustum (Lvn)
1951 - Shalimar (Lvn)
1951 - Maria Bonita (Royal)
1951 - Amor mio (Lvn)
1953 - Vod-A-Vil (Sampaguita)
1954 - Tres Muskiteras (Sampaguita)
1954 - Sa Isang Halik mo Pancho (Sampaguita)
1955 - Dalagita't Binatilyo (Lvn)
1955 - Mariang Sinukuan (Lvn)
1955 - Banda Uno (Lvn)
1955 - Karnabal (Lvn)
1955 - Pilipino Kostum No Touch (Lvn)
1957 - Lelong Mong Panot (Lvn)
1957 - Turista (Lvn)
1957 - 10,000 Pag-ibig (Lvn)
1958 - Tuloy ang Ligaya (Lvn)
1988 - One Day, Isang Araw (Regal Films)

Notes

External links

References

1918 births
1989 deaths
20th-century comedians
20th-century Filipino male actors
Burials at the Manila Memorial Park – Sucat
Filipino male comedians
Filipino male dancers
Filipino television personalities
Male actors from Laguna (province)
People from San Pablo, Laguna
Tap dancers